Simon Willison is a British programmer, co-founder of the social conference directory Lanyrd, and Director of Architecture at Eventbrite. Originating from the UK, he currently resides in San Francisco, California. Simon is a co-creator of the Django Web framework and is a frequent public speaker. Currently (November 2022) he is working on the Datasette project and other related projects.

Career

Simon started his professional web development in 2000 as a web master and developer for the UK based website Gameplay, where he was instrumental in creating File Monster, a large games related file download site. In 2001 he left to attend the University of Bath. Whilst studying, he worked part-time for Incutio where he developed the Incutio XML-RPC Library, a popular XML-RPC library for PHP (used in WordPress and Drupal). During this time Simon started his web development blog. In developing the software for his blog, Simon built one of the first implementations of pingback. Through his blog he was an early adopter and evangelist of OpenID.

In 2003–2004, whilst working at the Lawrence Journal-World during an industrial placement year, he and other web developers (Adrian Holovaty, Jacob Kaplan-Moss and Wilson Miner) created Django, an open source web application framework for Python.

After graduating in 2005, Simon worked on Yahoo!'s Technology Development team and on very early versions of the Fire Eagle Internet geolocation service. After Yahoo! he worked as a consultant on OpenID and web development in various publishing and media companies. Willison was hired in 2008 by the UK newspaper The Guardian to work as a software architect.

In late 2010, he launched the social conference directory Lanyrd with his wife and co-founder, Natalie Downe. They received funding from Y Combinator in early 2011. In 2013, Lanyrd was acquired by Eventbrite with Simon and Natalie joining the Eventbrite engineering team in San Francisco.

References

External links

Living people
Web developers
Computer programmers
Alumni of the University of Bath
1981 births